VV Nunspeet is a football club from Nunspeet, Netherlands. Nunspeet plays in the 2017–18 Eerste Klasse.

External links
 Official site

Football clubs in the Netherlands
1924 establishments in the Netherlands
Association football clubs established in 1924
Football clubs in Gelderland
Nunspeet